The Auke are an Alaskan Native people. Auke may also refer to:

Auke Mountain, named after the Auke people
Auke Bay, Alaska, a bay in Juneau
Auke Lake in Auke Bay
Auke (name), a Dutch masculine given name